Roma Routes was established in 2007 to encourage the study of European heritage and culture. The project was established by the  European Union  and ended in 2013. The main purpose of Roma Route was to break the "cultural barrier" between the Roma and Non-Roma. Roma is a very lonely group in Europe, and most European countries have "discrimination" against Roma. Discrimination in most European countries also prevents Roma's culture from spreading worldwide. Through Roma Route, the European Union hopes to change the living conditions of the Roma and enhance the cultural communication of the Roma to the world.  



History

Brief 

Roma culture is a unique culture but it is only passed down among the Roma. To bring awareness to the outside world and to repair the relationship between Roma and Non-Roma, the European Union has established a cultural communication program called Roma Route. The four objectives of the European Union established this cultural project are as follows: 1. Publicizing Roman heritage and culture; 2. Developing the culture of Roman heritage to the world; 3. Resonating and create dialogue between Roman culture and external culture; 4. Improving Roman image and help break the “cultural barrier” between Roma and Non-Roma. Before this cultural project, Roman culture and the outside world have been at a fault stage. The main reason for the cultural gap is racial discrimination, resulting in the Roma and the outside world do not know each other's culture. Roma Route hopes to break down racial discrimination by connecting the Roma (Gypsies)/Roma communities with the outside world.

Principal 
Project manager: Lalage Grundy

Roma representative: Ann Wilson

Roma culture

Roma 
The Roma (also called Gypsies) are one of the largest European ethnic minorities who have migrated in Europe for over 1,000 years. According to The United Nations Children's Fund (UNICEF), nearly 12 million to 15 million (70% of the Roma) still live in Eastern Europe. According to the data of the Time, there are 1 million the Roma living in the United States.

Belief 
The Roma does not have a unified belief, because they think they are "many stars scattered in the sight of God". The Roma are scattered throughout the world, their religious beliefs depend mainly on the religious beliefs of their country. But the Roma has his own rules of life, which is called "Rromamo." The Roma believes that "Rromamo" represents their world view.

Language and Culture 
The Roma have their own unique language and culture, and "Roma" is a word created by the Roma themselves. The language of Roma belongs to the Indo-Aryan, which is a branch of the Indo-European languages. Since Roma live in various parts of the world, they also have different dialects.

Roman Organization

Roma Support Group (RSG) 
The Roma Support Group was founded in 1998, which is a non-profit organization that helps Roma. In the past, the Roma were always discriminated against by people from other regions, resulting in the life of the Roma has always been in a dark state. In order to help the life of Roma, some Roma decided to set up the Roma Support Group.

Development history

Prospect 

Ms. Livia Jaroka, a Roma of partly Romanian descent, was a Hungarian female politician. Ms. Lívia Járóka was appointed by Hungary as the second Roma (but the first Roma woman) of the European Parliament in June 2004.

In 2005, nine countries (the Republic of Bulgaria, the Republic of Croatia, the Czech Republic, Hungary, the Republic of North Macedonia, Montenegro, Romania, Serbia and Slovakia) launched the “Decade of Roma Inclusion” to eliminating the prejudice against the Roma and improving the life of the Roma. Ms. Livia Jaroka (the European Parliament) and "Decade of Roma Inclusion" are the prospects for the formation of Roma Routes.

Early-stage preparations 
The Roma is the best publicist in spreading the culture of Roma. But before the launch of this cultural project, the Roma did not intend to share their own culture with the outside world. Because they believe that people of other races have always discriminated against them and they don't want to interact with the outside world. Through the European Union's continuous efforts and a series of cultural activities, the Roma agreed to participate in this cultural project.

Cultural museum about the Roma 

The Surrey County Council (United Kingdom) is the main museum of the Roma Route. The assisted museums are the Byzantine and Christian Museum, the Slovene Ethnographic Museum (Slovenia), Documentation and Cultural Centre of German Sinti and Roma (Germany), Association for Rural, Ecological and Cultural Tourism (Romania).

Partners 
As of the end of this project, the European Union has jointly developed a project to develop Roman culture with five countries. The initiator is the European Union and the assisting party is the Roman communities. The cultural project partners are Germany, Greece, The Republic of Slovenia, Romania and the United Kingdom.

Germany and Roma Route 

Documentation and Cultural Centre of German Sinti and Roma were established in Germany in the 1980s and officially opened to the public in 1997. Documentation and Cultural Centre of German Sinti and Roma record stories about the Roma and the persecution crimes of Roman by Nazi. Germany is committed to focusing on the propaganda of Documentation and Cultural Centre of German Sinti and Roma in order to support Roma Routes, allowing more Germans to understand and learn about the Roman culture.

Greece and Roma Route 

Roma has a long history in Greece. According to the material, the Roma entered the land of Greece in 1384 and settled in Greece. This historic moment represents the first important event that the Roma were discovered and recorded in Europe. Influenced by the Greek culture, some of the languages in the Roma culture are very similar to the Greek language. Through long-term residence, some Roma (known as Muslim Roma at that time) successfully owned Greek nationality in the 1930s. In the 1970s, all Roma who still lived in Greece were allowed to obtain Greek nationality. However, due to the long-term discrimination of Europeans and the unique culture of the Roma (they still communicate with their peers in their own language, they did not specialize in the Greek language. This is considered by the Greeks to be very high in the illiteracy rate of the Roma. Greece believes that they cannot communicate with the Roma, which is considered by the Greeks to be very high in the illiteracy rate of the Roma.), For the Greeks, discrimination against Roma is a very "normal" thing. According to Panayote Dimitras, which is the head of the Helsinki Monitor said that, “The Greek society is behaving racist while it pretends that it is not racist.”

The Roma are the most ethnic minority in Greece, but there is no definitive study on the number of Roma, religion, etc. There are also a large number of problems in the daily lives of most Roma people due to “discrimination”. In order to improve the situation of the Roma in Greece, the EU and Greece jointly carried out the activity (Roma Route). In order to support Greece, the EU has invested a lot of money for the Greek government. However, the cooperation between Greece and the EU has not achieved good results. Because the Europeans “habitually” discriminate against the Roma, the Greek government did not use the funds invested by the EU for the Roma. The only thing worth to note is that the Greek government spent only 80,000 euros to investigate the housing needs of Roma in Greece within three years.

Although the Greek government is not very formal in this cultural project, the Byzantine and Christian Museum still has done some work. The Byzantine and Christian Museum hosted a series of events that attracted members of the Roma communities to the museum. The art form of this cultural project is mainly film screenings, cultural conferences, educational exhibitions and training young Roma as informal “mediators” between communities and museums. In this way, The Byzantine Museum and the European Union broke the Romans' concept of “cultural exclusivity”. In the end, the Roma were willing to share their culture with others.

Slovenia and Roma Route 

In addition to attracting more Slovenians to learn more about Roman culture, the Slovene Ethnographic Museum (Slovenia) has also established a partnership with the government. The Republic of Slovenia considers Roma culture to be an important part of the diverse composition of European culture. However, this fact is rarely recognized. The Republic of Slovenia believes that they have a responsibility to contribute to the project of Roma Routes. In order to realize the project of Roma Route, the Republic of Slovenia decided to strengthen the human rights education of the Roma. The Republic of Slovenia hosted two meetings for the Roma Routes. The first meeting was "The Round Table on the Situation of Minorities in Slovenia and Slovenians Living Abroad" on 16 June 2009 in Brdo pri Kranju. The second meeting was "the Launch and Partnership Meeting of the “European Route of Roma Culture and Heritage” Project" on 7 and 8 October 2009 in Lendava and Kamenci.

The Round Table on the Situation of Minorities in Slovenia and Slovenians Living Abroad 
The initiator of the meeting is the Slovenian Chairmanship of the Committee of Ministers of the Council of Europe, the office of the Government of the Republic of Slovenia for Slovenes Abroad and the office of the Government of the Republic of Slovenia for National Minorities. The participants are representatives, experts and politicians of minority communities. This meeting is the first meeting that Slovenian government to discuss minority issues with the public. This meeting mainly discusses the situation of ethnic minorities and how to use their political influence to improve the life of minority people. In this meeting, government officials initially set two goals: protecting the rights of Italian and Hungarian minorities and establishing Roma community for Roma in Slovenia. The Prime Minister of the Republic of Slovenia, Borut Pahor pointed out that the Slovenian government need to continue to looking for the most correct minority policy and help them to improve the life.

The Launch and Partnership Meeting of the “European Route of Roma Culture and Heritage” Project 
The “European Route of Roma Culture and Heritage” Project is an event launched by the Slovenian government in conjunction with the European Union in response to the Roma Route, the aim of this project is to break the cultural partition between Roma and non-Roma and to allow both parties to communicate their respective cultures freely or face to face through this activity. At this meeting, the Slovenian government hopes to use the Roma, who living in Prekmurje as the starting point for this event. The Slovenian government pointed out that this event is not only beneficial to the Roma, it also has great help for Slovenia.Discrimination against a nation should not be a practice for Slovenian citizens, but it must be said that Roma are being discriminated against by people from all European countries. The Slovenian government hopes that the people of Slovenia can break through narrow ideas and pass this event.

Romania and Roma Route 
The association for Rural, Ecological and Cultural Tourism (Romania) also took some activities to encourage more people to understand Roma culture and communicate with the Roma.

The United Kingdom and Roma Route 
Roma is also one of the most disadvantaged minorities in the United Kingdom, as it is seen in other countries. The United Kingdom census does not take seriously the number of Roma in the United Kingdom, which is estimated to have at least 200,000 people. Roma are also restricted in every aspect of British life, such as housing and education and Roma and British culture do not mix because of difficulties. In order to spread Roma culture in United Kingdom, the European Union and the British government have also adopted some activities. The Surrey County Council (United Kingdom), the main responsible museum for the Roma Route, has increased the museum's publicity efforts to attract more British people to understand the Roma culture. But Roma's life and culture are about to plummet again without the help of the European Union (Brexit).

Achievement

The final conference 
On March 15, 2012, Documentation and Cultural Centre of German Sinti and Roma (Chairman of the Central Council of German Sinti and Roma: Romani Rose) held the last meeting of this cultural project.

At the meeting, cooperating countries and the European Union published the benefits of this project and celebrated the success of the development of the culture and heritage of Rome. For example: a successful youth summer camp helps Roma and non-Roma to break the cultural barrier.

They believe that this cultural event has been very successful with the Roma community and they have successfully developed the culture beyond Athens and Attica. Leaders of the cultural project of Roma Route and the European Union hope to continue to pass the cultural coverage to other parts of Greece through subsequent projects.

The achievement of Roma Route 
The benefits of this cultural project to the Roma are obvious. Firstly, Roma Route helped people in some European countries to eliminate some of the prejudice against the Roma. It is undeniable that many countries have been prejudiced against the Roma for centuries, and prejudice cannot be completely eliminated from this cultural project. The Roma Route is just the beginning, the leaders of the Roma Route hope that European countries can make up their minds to continue helping their nationals to reduce their prejudice against the Roma, thus achieving the complete elimination of the results through the Roma Route. Second, Roma Route successfully opened a cultural exchange bridge for Roma and non-Roma. A world with multiple cultures is a wonderful world, but people who create multiple cultures should not be locked into their own culture. A person who understands “shared culture” can enjoy the fun that multiculturalism brings to him/her.

The EU has taken the first step and a very important step for the cultural exchange between Roma and non-Roma. In the next cultural project about the Roma, they can achieve even higher achievements.

References

External links 

Romani studies
2007 establishments in Europe
2013 disestablishments in Europe